The following lists events that happened during 1937 in Chile.

Incumbents
President of Chile: Arturo Alessandri

Events

March
7 March – Chilean parliamentary election, 1937

Births 
3 January – Aquilles Gloffka
14 February – Carlos Campos Sánchez (d. 2020)
3 August – Patricio Manns, musician and writer (d. 2021)  
30 August – Fernando Alvarez (jockey) (d. 1999)

Deaths
4 August – Manuel Rivas Vicuña

References 

 
Years of the 20th century in Chile
Chile